"Ti Guarderò Nel Cuore" ("I will look into your heart"), later released under the international title "More", is a pop song adapted from a film score written by Riz Ortolani and Nino Oliviero for the 1962 Italian documentary film Mondo Cane. Ortolani and Oliviero originally composed the melody as an orchestral arrangement that served as the film's theme music. Italian lyrics were provided by Marcello Ciorciolini, which were adapted into English by Norman Newell. It has since become a pop standard.

The film Mondo Cane is a documentary, and uses a variety of music to accompany various segments. Some melodies are used repeatedly, in different styles, each named for the part of the movie where the music is used. Of the 15 music tracks on the soundtrack album, one melody is presented 6 times, another melody 2 times. The melody which became known as "More" is presented 4 times, named "Life Savers Girls", "The Last Flight/L'Ultimo Volo", "Models In Blue/Modelle in Blu", "Repabhan Street/Repabhan Strasse", in styles ranging from lush to march and 3/4 waltz.

"More" is one of Ortolani's acclaimed and influential works. It won the 1964 Grammy Award for Best Instrumental Theme. It was nominated for the Academy Award for Best Original Song at the 36th Academy Awards in 1964, where it was performed in English by Katyna Ranieri. The nomination led Ruggero Deodato to hire Ortolani to compose the score for his film Cannibal Holocaust.

Selective list of recorded versions

Katyna Ranieri
Katyna Ranieri recorded “'Ti Guarderò Nel Cuore” with italian lyrics in 1962, with an orchestra conducted by the composer Ortolani, who was also her husband. It was issued as a 45rpm single by MGM. Ranieri sang “More” live in english at the 36th Academy Awards in 1964, where the song was nominated for an Oscar.

Kai Winding version
"More" first caught U.S. attention as a pop instrumental hit by jazz trombone player Kai Winding that was arranged and conducted by Claus Ogerman, released as a single on Verve 10295. Popular in the summer and autumn of 1963, the record peaked at #2 on the Easy Listening chart and at #8 and lasted 15 weeks on the Billboard Hot 100,. Rather than employing a traditional jazz instrument, the recording's melody was instead performed on the electronic Ondioline by Jean-Jacques Perrey. Verve retitled the parent album Soul Surfin' containing "More" and other songs performed by Winding's big band !!!!More!!! (Theme from Mondo Cane) to capitalise on the single's popularity. While Winding's brassy performances feature top jazz players, notably Kenny Burrell on guitar, the arrangements are in so-called "surf music" style.

After Winding's recording became popular, United Artists added to the soundtrack cover a starburst stating "INCLUDED IN THIS ALBUM THE HIT SONG "MORE"".

Vic Dana version
A vocal version of "More" by Vic Dana stalled at #42 in early October 1963, two weeks before Winding's rendition dropped off the Billboard chart. But the song did much better over the years, recorded hundreds of times by many artists, ranging from Frank Sinatra to the Baja Marimba Band. It is now considered a pop standard.

Martin Denny Version

The Versatile Martin Denny -LP- (1963) LRP-3307/LST-7307

Carol Williams version
A 1976 cover by Carol Williams on the Salsoul label was popular when disco was breaking into the mainstream and is seen as an early disco classic. “More” was the first 12-inch commercial single that one could buy in stores all over the world. It made #4 on the Disco Singles, #8 on the Dance Music/Club Play Singles and #98 on the R&B Singles.

Other covers
Frank Sinatra's swinging version, with accompaniment by Count Basie and his orchestra and arranged by Quincy Jones, is on his 1964 album It Might as Well Be Swing.

Duke Ellington recorded a ballad version of the song on his Ellington '65 album.

Nat 'King' Cole recorded a version on his 1965 album L-O-V-E.

Sergio Franchi performed this song at many of his concerts, and on several TV shows (e.g. The Hollywood Palace on October 19, 1964). He recorded "More" on his 1964 RCA Victor album, The Exciting Voice of Sergio Franchi.

Andy Williams released a version of the song on his 1964 album, The Academy Award-Winning "Call Me Irresponsible" and Other Hit Songs from the Movies.

Ricky Nelson released a version on his 1965 album. "Love and Kisses" in 1965.

Bobby Solo released a version in the original Italian as "Ti Guardero Nel Cuore" in 1966.

Al Bishop and the Faxar from Iceland recorded the song in Oslo on August 23, 1967, released as single HMV 45-AL 6149.

Roy Orbison recorded a version on his 1969 album Roy Orbison's Many Moods.

Glen Campbell recorded the song in 1969 on his album Glen Campbell Live

The song was notably covered by The Supremes in their American and European performances from 1966 to 1968. Their version is found on Live at London's Talk of the Town and on Greatest Hits: Live in Amsterdam. The group also performed the song on The Ed Sullivan Show in 1966.

Stanley Turrentine recorded a version in 1971, released on his The Sugar Man album in 1975.

Vic Damone recorded a version on his 1997 album Greatest Love Songs of the Century.

The song was also covered by  Italian singer Matteo Brancaleoni in four different versions in his albums Just Smile (2006), Live in studio (2009), Live! (2011) and New Life (2012).

Amanda Lear covered the song in her 2021 album, Tuberose.

Other artists who have covered this song include Al Martino, Bobby Darin, The Ventures, Shirley Bassey, Brenda Lee,   Tom Jones, Matt Monro, Jack Jones, Booker T. & the M.G.'s, The Rascals, Alma Cogan, Doris Day, Harry James, Herb Alpert and the Tijuana Brass, Judy Garland (live in her CBS television series The Judy Garland Show in 1963), Line Renaud (in French), Connie Francis, Caterina Valente, Nancy Wilson, Karel Gott (in Czech) and Simone de Oliveira (in Portuguese).

References

1962 songs
1963 singles
Harry Connick Jr. songs
Nancy Wilson (jazz singer) songs
Andy Williams songs
Nat King Cole songs
Vic Damone songs
Glen Campbell songs
Caterina Valente songs
Film theme songs
Songs written for films
Patti Page songs
Songs with music by Riz Ortolani
Songs with lyrics by Norman Newell